Caterina Scorsone (born October 16, 1981) is a Canadian-American actress. She is best known for playing Dr. Amelia Shepherd on the ABC medical drama Grey's Anatomy (2010–present) and its spin-offs Private Practice (2010–2013) and Station 19 (2018–present). Prior to this, she made her debut as a child actor on the Canadian children's program, Mr. Dressup. She also appeared in a number of films, including 2010's Edge of Darkness and 2014's The November Man. Other television credits include Jess Mastriani on Missing, Callie Wilkinson on Crash, and Alice Hamilton on Alice.

Early life
Scorsone was born in Toronto, Ontario. She is the middle child of five in her family. Her father, Antonio Bruno Scorsone, is a social worker, and her mother, Suzanne Rozell Scorsone, is a social anthropologist. She is of half Italian descent. Her four siblings include: older twin sisters (b. 1977) Jovanna and Francesca (who serves as a chaplain in the Canadian Army, holding the rank of major), and a younger sister (Deborah Scorsone) and brother. She attended the Cardinal Carter Academy for the Arts in Toronto, as well as alternative school Subway Academy II. In addition, she attended Trinity College in the University of Toronto, majoring in Literary Studies and minoring in Philosophy, and in 2005 finished her studies there.

Career
Scorsone's first TV appearances were in Goosebumps adaptation of Night of the Living Dummy 2, then she progressed to regular guest spots as a child on the Canadian children's TV show Mr. Dressup.  In 1998, she had a role in one installment of CBC Radio's The Mystery Project called Peggy Delaney as Amber, an estranged fifteen-year-old daughter who comes from Vancouver to stay with her mom for a school term in Toronto.

Scorsone had her breakthrough after landing the leading role in the Lifetime crime drama series Missing, from 2003 to 2006. She played the part of Jess Mastriani, a young woman who sees missing persons in visions. After Jess saved some missing persons, she joined the FBI, where a special squad was formed around her, to find missing persons. In 2009, she starred as Alice Hamilton on the Showcase TV miniseries Alice which was later broadcast on Syfy in America.

In 2010, Scorsone joined the cast of Shonda Rhimes' drama series Private Practice in the  recurring role of Dr. Amelia Shepherd, the sister of Derek Shepherd from Grey's Anatomy. She was cast after Eric Stoltz, who was directing one of the show's episodes, heard about the role of Amelia and remembered Scorsone from working with her on My Horrible Year! He mentioned her to Shonda Rhimes and commented on the resemblance Scorsone had to Patrick Dempsey (the actor who plays Derek Shepherd). As of July 2010, Scorsone had been promoted to series regular for Private Practice.  She appeared in the third episode of the seventh season of Grey's Anatomy where Amelia and Derek started to reconcile their differences.

In March 2014, Scorsone returned to Grey's Anatomy after a two-year absence as a recurring guest star. In June of the same year, it was announced that she was promoted to series regular status for the show's eleventh season.

Personal life
Scorsone married Rob Giles of The Rescues in June 2009. They have three daughters: Eliza (born July 6, 2012), Paloma Michaela "Pippa" (born November 8, 2016) and Arwen Lucinda "Lucky" (born December 13, 2019).

Her first pregnancy was written into her character's storyline in season 5 of Private Practice, her second pregnancy was not featured in Grey's Anatomy, and her third pregnancy was written into her character's storyline on season 16 of Grey's Anatomy.

She has become an outspoken advocate for children who were born with Down syndrome and other cognitive disabilities, since the birth of her second daughter, Pippa, who was born with the syndrome. She received the Quincy Jones Exceptional Advocacy Award from the Global Down Syndrome Foundation on November 14, 2020, for her advocacy.

Scorsone and Giles separated in March 2020. In May 2020, they filed  for divorce after ten years of marriage.

Filmography

References

External links

 Official website
 

1981 births
Actresses from Toronto
Canadian child actresses
Canadian expatriate actresses in the United States
Canadian film actresses
Canadian television actresses
Living people
Trinity College (Canada) alumni
University of Toronto alumni
20th-century Canadian actresses
21st-century Canadian actresses
Canadian people of Italian descent
People with acquired American citizenship